Chinggis Khaan International Airport, also referred to as New Ulaanbaatar International Airport , is an international airport located in the Khöshig Valley of Sergelen, Töv, Mongolia, 52 km south of the capital Ulaanbaatar and 20 km southwest of Zuunmod. It started its operations on 4 July 2021 and serves as the primary airport for Ulaanbaatar and its metropolitan area, functioning as a replacement for Buyant-Ukhaa International Airport. Named after Genghis Khan (1162–1227), it is the largest air facility in the country, serving as a hub for all major Mongolian airlines.

The airport is designed with a capacity of handling up to 1,100 passengers per hour and three million passengers per year, with cargo capacity set at 11,900 tons.

The airport is connected via highway to Ulaanbaatar, with four shuttle bus routes operating to and from various points in Ulaanbaatar as of 2021.

Name
The new airport was given its current name on 2 July 2020, with the former Chinggis Khaan International Airport reverting to its pre-2005 name of Buyant-Ukhaa International Airport.

The airport has been referred to by various names during the planning and construction phases, including New Ulaanbaatar International Airport, Khöshig Valley Airport, and Khöshigt Valley Airport.

History
Ulaanbaatar's former main airport, Buyant-Ukhaa International Airport, is located in close proximity to two mountains to its south and east, so only one end of its runway was able to be used, and was often adversely affected by weather events.

Development

Initial planning for the airport was done in 2006 with Japanese government assistance.

In May 2008, a  40-year soft loan agreement at 0.2% interest was signed between the Government of Mongolia and the Japan Bank for International Cooperation to build a new international airport. The loan required that the project is to be carried out by Japanese consultants and contractors; however, the materials and equipment the contractors use could be up to 70% from any country. Between 2009 and 2011, Azusa Sekkei and Oriental Consultants Joint Venture made the design and bid documentation for the airport. In 2011, a call for bids was announced for the construction of the airport, with the Mitsubishi-Chiyoda Joint Venture (MCJV) successful in the technical bidding. An extended price review and contract negotiation were completed on 10 May 2013 when the main construction contract was signed between MCJV and the Civil Aviation Authority of Mongolia.

The final amount of loans from the Japanese Government for the development of the airport totaled , to be paid over forty years.

Construction
The groundbreaking ceremony was on 22 April 2012, with initial construction starting with a site flood-protection scheme. Other works under way included the construction of the electric power line from Nalaikh.

Main construction lasted from May 2013 to April 2020. The concrete pouring work for the control tower started on 13 September 2013. On 29 January 2014, the airport's electric substation construction was completed and connected to the Mongolian central grid.

Construction of a six-lane, 30 km-long highway to Ulaanbaatar started in May 2016, and ended in 2019.

While the initial opening date was slated for December 2016, the bulk of construction only ended in 2017. Opening of the airport was repeatedly delayed to 2018, 2019, 2020, and 2021. These delays were related to contract negotiations regarding the operation and ownership of the airport, the construction of the highway to Ulaanbaatar, and the impact of the COVID-19 pandemic in Mongolia.

Operations at the airport started on 4 July 2021, with an inaugural flight to Tokyo operated by MIAT Mongolian Airlines, flying Ulaanbaatar-Narita-Ulaanbaatar with a Boeing 737.

Operations

Governance 
Chinggis Khaan International Airport is managed by New Ulaanbaatar International Airport LLC, which is responsible for the airport's operations until 2036. It was formed as a partnership between two companies: Japan Airport Management LLC (owned by Mitsubishi Corporation, Narita International Airport Corporation, Japan Airport Terminal, and JALUX), and will hold 51% of the company, while Khushigiin Khundii Airport, funded by the Government of Mongolia, owns a 49% stake. JALUX manages the airport's retail businesses.

Airlines and destinations

Airport overview 
The airport covers an area of 104,200 m2.

Passengers 

Cargo 
It also contains separate facilities for the import/export of dangerous, high-value, and refrigerated goods.

Ground transportation
The airport is connected to the highway to the capital, with shuttle buses operating from four points in Ulaanbaatar: Dragon Bus Terminal, Buyant Ukhaa, Ulaanbaatar railway station, and Dunjingarav Market with expected travel time of 80–100 minutes one way. About 60 taxis are also set to serve passengers. However, the bus services are not fully operational due to COVID-19 travel restrictions.

See also
List of airports in Mongolia

Notes

References

External links
 Official Airport Website
 (Main Operator) Nubia LLC Website
Khoshig Valley Airport State Owned LLC
 
 

Airports in Mongolia
Airports established in 2021
2021 establishments in Mongolia
Töv Province
Transport in Ulaanbaatar
Genghis Khan